Tayfun Özcan is a Dutch-Turkish kickboxer, born and raised in Tilburg, Netherlands. He is the former Enfusion 72.5 kg and 70 kg World champion. He is currently signed with ONE Championship.

Tayfun holds notable wins over Andy Souwer, Davit Kiria, Mohamed Khamal, Amansio Paraschiv, Endy Semeleer, Jonay Risco and Mohammed Jaraya.

Combat Press ranks him as the #7 lightweight kickboxer in the world.

Kickboxing career

Enfusion
Ozcan won his first major kickboxing title in 2015, with a fifth round knockout victory over Fran Palenzuela, winning the Enfusion 72.5 kg title.

In the following year Tayfun participated in the Enfusion 70 kg MAX Tournament. In the semi final bout he fought Madicke Kamara. Kamara retired from the fight at the end of the second round. In the final Özcan fought a rematch with Mohammed Jaraya, winning the fight, and the tournament, through a unanimous decision.

Özcan next participated in the Kunlun Fight World MAX Tournament Final 16 qualification. After beating Davit Kiria in the first round through a decision, Özcan would suffer a second round left hook KO in the following bout, at the hands of Wu Xuesong.

In 2018 Tayfun fought Andy Souwer for the Enfusion 72.5 kg World title. He once again captured the title with a fourth round KO win. He defended his title twice, with a third round TKO victory over  Ardalan Sheikholeslam, and a decision victory, over the then 75 kg champion, Endy Semeleer.

He briefly left Enfusion to fight for the Arena Fight 72 kg title against Mohamed Hendouf. Özcan won the fight by a unanimous decision.

During Enfusion 92 Tayfun attempted to become a two weight Enfusion world champion, when he challenged the reigning 70 kg title holder Jonay Risco to a rematch. Özcan won the fight by a unanimous decision.

ONE Championship
In February 2020, Ozcan signed with ONE Championship. He was supposed to debut at ONE: Big Bang, but was forced to withdraw due to an injury.

Ozcan was scheduled to make his debut at ONE Championship: Battleground on July 30, 2021 against Sitthichai Sitsongpeenong. However, Ozcan was forced with withdraw due to an injury and Sitthichai was rescheduled to face Tawanchai P.K. Saenchaimuaythaigym at ONE Championship: Battleground 3 instead.

Featherweight Kickboxing Grand Prix
Özcan was scheduled to face Sitthichai Sitsongpeenong in the quarterfinals of the ONE Featherweight Grand Prix, which was held at ONE Championship: First Strike on October 15, 2021. Özcan lost to Sitthichai by split decision.

Post-Grand Prix
Özcan faced Enriko Kehl at ONE: Full Circle on February 25, 2022. He won the bout via unanimous decision.

Özcan was expected to face the former Glory lightweight champion Marat Grigorian at ONE on Prime Video 2 on September 30, 2022. On September 21, Özcan was rescheduled to Superbon Singha Mawynn for the ONE Kickboxing Featherweight Championship as a short-notice replacement for the injured Chingiz Allazov. Özcan was later once again booked to face Grigorian, as Yusupov and Superbon both failed the pre-fight medical, held the day before the event. He lost the fight by unanimous decision.

Özcan faced Ali Baniasad at Enfusion #119 - 10 Year Anniversary on February 11, 2023. He won the fight by a second-round technical knockout.

Titles and accomplishments
Arena Fight
2019 Arena Fight Kickboxing Champion (-72.000 kg)
Enfusion
2019 Enfusion "Male Fighter of the Year"
2019 Enfusion -70 kg World Champion (One time, former)
2016 Enfusion 16-Man 70 kg World MAX Tournament Champion
2015 Enfusion 72.5 kg World Champion (Two times, former)
Two successful title defenses
2015 Enfusion 2015 70 kg Tournament Champion

Professional kickboxing record

|-  style="background:#cfc;"
| 2023-02-11 || Win ||align=left| Ali Baniasad || Enfusion #119 - 10 Year Anniversary || Nijmegen, Netherlands || TKO (Referee stoppage) || 2  ||2:55 

|-  style="background:#fbb;"
| 2022-10-01 || Loss ||align=left| Marat Grigorian || ONE on Prime Video 2 || Kallang, Singapore || Decision (Unanimous) ||  3 || 3:00

|-  style="background:#cfc;"
| 2022-02-25 || Win ||align=left| Enriko Kehl || ONE: Full Circle || Kallang, Singapore || Decision (Unanimous) || 3 || 3:00 

|- style="background:#fbb;"
| 2021-10-15|| Loss ||align=left| Sitthichai Sitsongpeenong || ONE Championship: First Strike || Kallang, Singapore || Decision (Split) || 3 || 3:00
|-
! style=background:white colspan=9 |

|-  style="background:#cfc;"
| 2020-02-29 || Win ||align=left| Daniel Moscardo|| Enfusion 96 || Eindhoven, Netherlands || Decision (Unanimous) || 3 || 3:00
|-  style="background:#CCFFCC;"
| 2019-12-06 || Win ||align=left| Jonay Risco || Enfusion 92 || Abu Dhabi, United Arab Emirates || Decision (Unanimous) || 5 || 3:00
|-
! style=background:white colspan=9 |
|-  bgcolor="#CCFFCC"
| 2019-10-26 || Win ||align=left| Edye Ruiz || Enfusion #89 ||  Wuppertal, Germany|| Decision (Unanimous) || 3 || 3:00
|-  style="background:#cfc;"
| 2019-06-08 || Win  ||align=left| Mohamed Hendouf || Arena Fight || France || Decision (Unanimous) || 5 || 3:00
|-
! style=background:white colspan=9 |
|-
|- style="background:#cfc;"
| 2019-02-23 || Win ||align=left| Endy Semeleer|| Enfusion Live 79|| Netherlands || Decision || 5 || 3:00
|-
! style=background:white colspan=9 |
|-
|-  style="background:#cfc;"
| 2018-10-27 || Win ||align=left|  Amansio Paraschiv|| Enfusion 73|| Germany || Decision  || 3 || 3:00 
|-
|-  style="background:#cfc;"
| 2018-09-29 || Win ||align=left|  Ardalan Sheikholeslam|| Enfusion 71 || Germany || TKO (Referee Stoppage/Cut) || 3 || 0:33 
|-
! style=background:white colspan=9 |
|-
|-  style="background:#cfc;"
| 2018-06-23 || Win ||align=left|  Mohamed Khamal|| Enfusion 69|| Netherlands || TKO (Four Knockdowns/Right Hooks) || 3 || 1:40 
|-
|- style="background:#cfc;"
| 2018-02-17 || Win ||align=left| Andy Souwer|| Enfusion Live 62  || Amsterdam || KO (Overhand Right)|| 4 || 2:12
|-
! style=background:white colspan=9 |
|- style="background:#cfc;"
| 2017-11-11 || Win ||align=left|  Petchchaiyo Banchamek || Enfusion Live 55  Final 16|| Amsterdam || Decision || 3 || 3:00
|- style="background:#cfc;"
| 2017-09-30|| Win || align="left" | Redouan Laarkoubi   || Enfusion Live 53 || Belgium || TKO (Referee Stoppage/Punches)|| 1 || 1:24
|- style="background:#cfc;"
| 2017-08-05|| Win || align="left" | Ilyass Chakir  || Fight League 7 || Morocco || Decision (Unanimous)|| 3 || 3:00
|- style="background:#cfc;"
| 2017-04-29 || Win || align="left" | Nordin Ben Moh || Enfusion Live 46  || Zoetermeer, Netherlands || KO (Punches) || 2 || 1:23
|-  style="background:#fbb;"
| 2017-02-18 || Loss ||align=left| Jonay Risco || Enfusion Live 45  || Eindhoven, Netherlands || TKO (Doctor stoppage/shin cut) || 2 || 1:21
|- style="background:#cfc;" 
| 2016-11-20 || Win ||align=left| Serginio Kanters || Enfusion Live 43 || Groningen, Netherlands || Decision || 3 || 3:00
|-  style="background:#cfc;"
| 2016-09-19 || Win ||align=left| Mohammed Jaraya || Enfusion Live 41 || Antwerp, Belgium || Decision  || 3 || 3:00
|-
|-  style="background:#fbb;"
| 2016-04-08 || Loss||align=left| Wu Xuesong || Kunlun Fight 41 - Group 7, Final || China || KO (Left Hook) || 2 || 0:21
|-
! style=background:white colspan=9 |
|-
|-  style="background:#cfc;"
| 2016-04-08 || Win ||align=left| Davit Kiria || Kunlun Fight 41 - Group 7, Semi Finals || China || Decision (unanimous) || 3 || 3:00
|-
|-  style="background:#cfc;"
| 2016-02-27 || Win ||align=left| Mohammed Jaraya || Enfusion Live 37 MAX Final || Eindhoven, Netherlands || Decision  || 3 || 3:00
|-
! style=background:white colspan=9 |
|-
|-  style="background:#cfc;"
| 2016-02-27 || Win ||align=left| Madicke Kamara || Enfusion Live 37 MAX Semi Finals|| Eindhoven, Netherlands || TKO (Opponent Gave Up)|| 2 || 3:00
|-
|-  style="background:#cfc;"
| 2015-11-21 || Win ||align=left| William Diender || Enfusion Live 34  || Groningen, Netherlands || Decision (Unanimous) || 3 || 3:00
|-
|-  style="background:#cfc;"
| 2015-09-19 || Win ||align=left| Fran Palenzuela || Enfusion Live 31  || Málaga, Spain || KO  || 5 || 3:00
|-
! style=background:white colspan=9 |
|-
|-  style="background:#cfc;"
| 2015-05-24 || Win ||align=left| Aziz Kallah || Enfusion Live 29 70 kg tournament Final  || Amsterdam, Netherlands || Decision (Unanimous) || 3 || 3:00
|-
! style=background:white colspan=9 |
|-
|-  style="background:#cfc;"
| 2015-05-24 || Win ||align=left| Redouan Larkoubi || Enfusion Live 29 70 kg tournament Semi Finals  || Amsterdam, Netherlands || KO (Right+Left Hook) || 1 || 3:00
|-
|-  style="background:#cfc;"
| 2015-04-06 || Win ||align=left| William Diender || Born 2 Fight || Elst, Netherlands || TKO (Retirement) || 1 || 3:00
|-
|-  style="background:#fbb;"
| 2015-02-07 ||Loss ||align=left| Mohammed Jaraya || Enfusion Live 24 || Eindhoven, Netherlands || Extra Round Decision|| 4|| 3:00
|-
|-  style="background:#cfc;"
| 2014-12-21 ||Win||align=left| Ismael Benali|| Enfusion Live 24 || Antwerp, Belgium || TKO || 2|| 3:00
|-
|-  style="background:#cfc;"
| 2014-11-30 ||Win||align=left| Sen Bunthen|| Pradal Serey Cambodian Stadium || Cambodia || Decision|| 3|| 3:00
|-
|-  style="background:#fbb;"
| 2014-09-20 ||Loss ||align=left| Harut Grigorian || A1 World Combat Cup - Final 8, Semi Finals || Eindhoven, Netherlands || Decision|| 3|| 3:00
|-
|-  style="background:#cfc;"
| 2014-09-20 ||Win||align=left| Mo Ben Nasser|| A1 World Combat Cup - Final 8, Quarter Finals || Eindhoven, Netherlands || KO || 1|| 1:03
|-
|-  style="background:#cfc;"
| 2014-06-07 ||Win||align=left| Sen Bunthen || Rencontre Internationale Kun Khmer || Loon-Plage, France || Decision || 3 || 3:00
|-
|-  style="background:#cfc;"
| 2014-05-17 ||Win||align=left| Marcel Verhaar|| A1 World Combat Cup - Final 16|| Eindhoven, Netherlands || KO || 2|| 3:00
|-
|-  style="background:#cfc;"
| 2014-04-22 ||Win||align=left| Jay Da Vega || Enfusion Live - Sportmani Events V || Eindhoven, Netherlands || Decision || 3 || 3:00
|-
|-  style="background:#c5d2ea;"
| 2014-02-08 ||Draw||align=left| Arman Hambaryan|| Nuit des Spartiates|| France || Decision || 5|| 3:00
|-  style="background:#cfc;"
| 2014-01-12|| Win||align=left| Giga Chikadze || Enfusion Live 12 || Alkmaar, Netherlands || Decision (Unanimous) || 3 || 3:00
|-
|-  style="background:#cfc;"
| 2013-09-28 || Win ||align=left| Wael Karoumi || A1 World Combat Cup || Eindhoven, Netherlands || Decision || 3 || 3:00
|-
|-  style="background:#c5d2ea;"
| 2013-06-01 ||Draw||align=left| Yassin Baitar|| N-1 Challenge Fight Night|| Belgium || Decision || 3|| 3:00
|-
|-  style="background:#cfc;"
| 2013-05-11 || Win ||align=left| Pajonsuk SuperPro Samui || Enfusion Live 5 || Eindhoven, Netherlands || Decision || 3 || 3:00
|-
|-  style="background:#c5d2ea;"
| 2013-03-03 ||Draw||align=left| Edgard Nzunga || Ikuza 2 || Brussels, Belgium || Decision || 3|| 3:00
|-
|-  style="background:#cfc;"
| 2013-02-16 || Win||align=left| Mo Bennasser || Sportmani Events IV || Amsterdam, Netherlands || Decision (Unanimous) || 5 || 3:00
|-
|-  style="background:#fbb;"
| 2012-10-06 || Loss ||align=left| Fabio Pinca || Time Fight 2 || Tours, France || TKO (broken arm) || 3 || 3:00
|-
|-  style="background:#cfc;"
| 2012-09-22 || Win||align=left| Hicham Boubarki || A-1 World Combat Cup || Eindhoven, Netherlands || TKO (Referee stoppage) || 2 || 
|-
|-  style="background:#fbb;"
| 2012-06-10 || Loss ||align=left| Nordin Ben Moh || Cobra Night || Belgium || TKO  || 3 || 3:00
|-  style="background:#cfc;"
| 2012-05-06 || Win||align=left| Naïm Dahou || Force & Honneur || Brussels, Belgium || Decision || 5 || 3:00
|-
|-  style="background:#cfc;"
| 2012-04-14 || Win||align=left| Mohamed Bouzagou || Time Fight || Brussels, Belgium || Decision || 5 || 3:00
|-
! style=background:white colspan=9 |
|-
|-  style="background:#cfc;"
| 2012-04-07 || Win||align=left| Petros Sedarous  || A1 World Combat Cup || Eindhoven, Netherlands || Decision || 3 || 3:00
|-  style="background:#cfc;"
| 2012-03-04 || Win||align=left| Alka Matewa || Force & Honneur || Brussels, Belgium || Decision || 3 || 3:00
|-
|-  style="background:#cfc;"
| 2012-02-26 || Win||align=left| Omar Baqi || Vuisten Van Vuur || 's-Hertogenbosch, Netherlands || Decision || 3 || 3:00
|-
|-  style="background:#cfc;"
| 2011-12-23 ||Win||align=left| Dennis Esajas || Klaar Omte Bossen! || Paramaribo, Suriname || KO || 2 ||  
|-
|-  style="background:#cfc;"
| 2011-10-01 ||Win||align=left| Twan Aarts || Judgement Day III || Panningen,  Netherlands || Decision || 3|| 3:00
|-
|-  style="background:#fbb;"
| 2011-06-05 || Loss ||align=left| Yassin Baitar || FightSensation || Beveren, Belgium || Decision || 3 || 3:00
|-
|-  style="background:#cfc;"
| 2011-04-09 ||Win||align=left| Quincy Kerraigde|| A1 World Combat Cup || Eindhoven, Netherlands || Decision || 3|| 3:00
|-
|-  style="background:#fbb;"
| 2011-01-29 || Loss ||align=left| Robbie Hageman  || FightSensation || Eindhoven, Netherlands|| Decision || 3 || 3:00
|-
| colspan=9 | Legend:

See also
List of male kickboxers

References

1991 births
Living people
Dutch male kickboxers
Turkish male kickboxers
Kunlun Fight kickboxers
ONE Championship kickboxers